Veerabhadram Chowdary is an Indian film director known for his works in Telugu cinema. 
He made his directorial debut in 2011 through Aha Naa Pellanta.

Personal life
Mullapudi Veerabhadram Chowdary was born in the village Kalavalapalli in West Godavari District of Andhra Pradesh.
His father is a farmer and his mother is a housewife. He joined the film industry as assistant director in 1997.

Filmography as Director

Filmography as co-director

==References==

Living people
People from West Godavari district
Telugu film directors
Film directors from Andhra Pradesh
21st-century Indian film directors
1975 births